John Richard Boyle, 15th Earl of Cork and 15th Earl of Orrery (born 3 November 1945) is a British hereditary peer and a member of the House of Lords, where he sits as a Crossbencher. Boyle was an officer in the Royal Navy and then had a career in the sugar industry before inheriting his titles in 2003.

Royal Navy 
Boyle entered the Royal Navy and graduated from Royal Naval College, Dartmouth. In 1976, as a Lieutenant-Commander, he was given the command of HMS Sealion but retired from the RN in 1979 and went to work in the sugar industry.

Politics 
Boyle was first styled as Viscount Dungarvan as a courtesy title from 1995 following his father inheriting the earldoms. He inherited the title of Earl of Cork and Orrery following the death of his father, John Boyle, 14th Earl of Cork on 14 November 2003. He was elected to sit in the House of Lords at a crossbench hereditary peers' by-election in July 2016, following Lord Bridges ceasing to be a member of the House owing to his non-attendance of the House, a provision that was created following the passage of the House of Lords Reform Act 2014. He defeated Richard Hubert Gordon Gilbey, 12th Baron Vaux of Harrowden by 15 votes to 8 in a vote of all sitting crossbench hereditary peers. Though his Irish titles came from the Peerage of Ireland, which does not make him eligible for election, he also holds the title of Baron Boyle of Marston in the Peerage of Great Britain which allowed him to stand in the by-election for hereditary peers. In the House of Lords, he is referred to by his higher ranking Irish titles as Earl of Cork and Orrery despite being elected via his barony.

Personal life 

The Earl of Cork and Orrery was educated at Harrow School. He is married to Rebecca Juliet née Noble, daughter of Michael Noble, Baron Glenkinglas. They have three children; an elder daughter Lady Cara Willoughby and twins Lady Davina Knight, and Rory, Viscount Dungarvan.

References

1945 births
Living people
Crossbench hereditary peers
Royal Navy officers
People educated at Harrow School
Barons Boyle of Marston
British people of Irish descent
John
15th
15th
12th
Hereditary peers elected under the House of Lords Act 1999